Leo Yaffe,  (July 6, 1916 – May 14, 1997) was a Canadian nuclear chemistry scientist and a proponent of the peaceful uses of nuclear power.

Born in Devils Lake, North Dakota, his family moved to Winnipeg in 1920. He studied at the University of Manitoba receiving a B.Sc.(Hons) in 1940, a M.Sc. in 1941, and was awarded an honorary D.Sc. in 1982. He received a Ph.D. in 1943 from McGill University.

In 1943, he was recruited by Atomic Energy of Canada Limited to work at the Manhattan Project's  Montreal Laboratory, moving to the Chalk River Laboratories, on the banks of the Ottawa River, in Ontario, at the end of the war. He remained with the AECL until 1952.

In 1952, he moved to Montreal, where the J.S. Foster cyclotron had just been built at McGill University. In 1958 he became the Macdonald Professor of Chemistry.

From 1963 to 1965 he was director of research at the International Atomic Energy Agency in Vienna. Returning to McGill he was appointed head of the department of chemistry until 1972. In 1974 he was appointed vice-principal (administration) which he held until he retired in 1981. From 1981 to 1982, he was the president of the Chemical Institute of Canada.

He married Betty Workman and has two children: Carla Krasnick, and Mark Yaffe. Yaffe died in Montreal in 1997. The McGill University Archives holds a collection of his personal papers and photographs.

Honours
 Fellow, Royal Society of Canada, 1959
 Doctor of Letters, Trent University, 1980
 Officer, Order of Canada, 1988
 Prix Marie-Victorin, Prix du Québec, 1990

Quotes
 "People, unfortunately, tend to equate nuclear with bombs. I'm a passionate believer in the peaceful purposes of nuclear energy. What people don't realize is how many people are being helped to surmount medical problems with nuclear medicine."
 "The transmission of knowledge from one generation to the next remains for me the most noble of the professions."

References

External links 

Leo Yaffe Fonds, MG4046. McGill University Library and Archives.

1916 births
1997 deaths
People from Devils Lake, North Dakota
American emigrants to Canada
Canadian chemists
Canadian university and college faculty deans
Fellows of the Royal Society of Canada
McGill University alumni
Academic staff of McGill University
Nuclear chemists
Officers of the Order of Canada
University of Manitoba alumni
International Atomic Energy Agency officials
Manhattan Project people
Fellows of the American Physical Society